Nuhne is a river of North Rhine-Westphalia and of Hesse, Germany. It is a left tributary of the Eder, which it joins near Frankenberg.

See also
List of rivers of North Rhine-Westphalia
List of rivers of Hesse

References

Rivers of North Rhine-Westphalia
Rivers of Hesse
Rivers of Germany